Hesar-e Hasan Beyk (also Romanized as Ḩeşār-e Ḩasan Beyk and Ḩeşār-e Ḩasan Beyg) is a village in Behnamarab-e Jonubi Rural District, Javadabad District, Varamin County, Tehran Province, Iran. At the 2006 census, its population was 1,019, in 262 families.

References 

Populated places in Varamin County